Marius-Félix-Antoine Maziers (1 March 1915 – 14 August 2008) was French Bishop of the Catholic Church.

Marius Maziers was born in Siran, France, raised in the Roman Catholic faith and was ordained a priest on 9 October 1938. On 17 December 1959, he was appointed Titular Bishop of Augustopolis in Phrygia and auxiliary bishop of Archdiocese of Lyon and was consecrated on 25 February 1960. He was appointed Coadjutor Archbishop of the Bordeaux and Titular Bishop of Zica. He succeeded to the post of Archbishop of Bordeaux with the death of his predecessor on 6 February 1968 and served until his retirement on 31 May 1989.

Archbishop Maziers died on 14 August 2008 at the age of 93.

See also
Archdiocese of Bordeaux
Archdiocese of Lyon

External links
Catholic-Hierarchy
Death Notice

1915 births
2008 deaths
Auxiliary bishops of Lyon
20th-century Roman Catholic archbishops in France
Participants in the Second Vatican Council
Archbishops of Bordeaux